Videoland Television Network is a cable television network program provider in Taiwan, founded in 1983 by Koos Group. Videoland is one of Taiwan's major satellite television providers, offering seven channels of programming. Videoland is also sales agent for the Pili Channel and the Discovery Channel.

Videoland's operations include an Engineering Division, a Programming Division and an Advertising Division as well as an Advertising Sales Division which is responsible for advertising sales for each of the television channels. In addition, Ho-wei Communications handles sales to system operators throughout Taiwan. Together these various units make up a complete package of television programming.

Videoland ventured outside the area of channel operations with the Videoland Hunters of the local SBL basketball league in 2004. The team serves as a source of program materials for the Videoland Sports Channel and has been a key factor in promoting the development of sports and recreation in Taiwan.

Videoland is also the official media partner of National Basketball Association (NBA) and holding exclusive broadcasting right for all media in Taiwan.

External links
 Videoland Official Site
 Videoland Official Site
 For Videoland's Logo Site
 Videoland Channels signals on Lyngsat

Television stations in Taiwan
Television channels and stations established in 1983
Companies based in Taipei